The 1949 Navy Midshipmen football team represented the United States Naval Academy during the 1949 college football season. In their second season under head coach George Sauer, the Midshipmen compiled a 3–5–1 record and were outscored by their opponents by a combined score of 238 to 151.

Schedule

References

Navy
Navy Midshipmen football seasons
Navy Midshipmen football